is a town located in Nagano Prefecture, Japan. , the town had an estimated population of 4,676 in 2012 households, and a population density of 41 persons per km².

The town mascot is "Ptylitza", an imaginary small gnome-like creature, images of which can be seen all over the town.

Geography
Koumi is located in the far east of Nagano. The nearest city is Saku, about 40 minutes drive away. Nagano city is about 100 km away. Mount Tengu (2646 meters) is located on the border of Koumi with Chino. the Chikuma River flows through the town.

Surrounding municipalities
Nagano Prefecture
Chino
Minamimaki
Kitaaiki
Minamiaiki
Sakuho

Climate
The town has a humid continental climate characterized by warm and humid summers, and cold winters with heavy snowfall (Köppen climate classification Dfb).  The average annual temperature in Koumi is 8.2 °C. The average annual rainfall is 1398 mm with September as the wettest month. The temperatures are highest on average in August, at around 20.9 °C, and lowest in January, at around -4.0 °C.

Demographics
Per Japanese census data, the population of Koumi has declined over the past 60 years.

History
The area of present-day Koumi was part of ancient Shinano Province. The village of Koumi was established on April 1, 1889 with the establishment of the municipalities system. It merged with the village of Kitamaki on September 30, 1956 and was elevated to town status.

Education
Koumi has one public elementary school operated by the city government and one public middle school shared with Kitaaiki and Minamiaiki villages. Koumi has a public high school operated by the Nagano Prefectural Board of Education.

Transportation

Railway
 East Japan Railway Company – Koumi Line
  -  -

Highway

Notable people from Koumi
 Makoto Shinkai, anime director. Shinkai was inspired by Lake Matsubara in his hometown to create the lake in his famous film, Your Name.

References

External links

Official Website 

 
Towns in Nagano Prefecture